Moses Leo (born 11 August 1997) is a New Zealand rugby sevens player.

Leo was named in the All Blacks Sevens squad for the 2022 Commonwealth Games in Birmingham. He won a bronze medal at the event. He made the squad for the Rugby World Cup Sevens in Cape Town and won a silver medal after his side lost to Fiji in the gold medal final.

References

External links
Moses Leo at All Blacks.com

1997 births
Living people
New Zealand international rugby sevens players
Commonwealth Games rugby sevens players of New Zealand
New Zealand male rugby sevens players
Commonwealth Games medallists in rugby sevens
New Zealand rugby union players
Rugby union wings
North Harbour rugby union players
Rugby sevens players at the 2022 Commonwealth Games
Commonwealth Games bronze medallists for New Zealand
Medallists at the 2022 Commonwealth Games